Airline is an American reality television series that showcases the daily happenings of passengers, ground workers and on-board staff members of Southwest Airlines. The series debuted on January 5, 2004, on A&E and ran for three seasons.  It was narrated by Tim Flavin.

On December 15, 2005, it was cancelled after three seasons.

Premise
The series is focused on passengers and flights originating out of Southwest Airlines focus cities at Baltimore-Washington International, Chicago Midway, Houston's Hobby Airport and Los Angeles International. The series also follows customers in all types of moods and situations, and also takes a look at employees both on and off the job.

The series is based on a British series of the same name.  The British series followed the employees of Britannia Airways in its first season and EasyJet airlines in subsequent seasons.

Cast

Baltimore/Washington (BWI)
 Eric DeCosmo — Provising Agent
 Christy Goad-DeCosmo — Customer Service Agent
 Nicholas Hadeed — Customer Service Agent/Flight Attendant
 Carole Jennings - Customer Service  Supervisor
 Sue Lee — Customer Service Supervisor
 Chris Marr — Customer Service Supervisor
 Gina Terrano — Customer Service Agent/Flight Attendant

Chicago-Midway (MDW)
Jesse Atkinson — Customer Service Supervisor
 Colleen Bragiel — Customer Service Manager
 Val Brown — Customer Service Supervisor
 Denise Brown-Bess — Customer Service Supervisor
 Anita Herbert — Customer Service Supervisor
 Veolia Hewitt-Norris — Customer Service Manager

Houston-Hobby (HOU)
 Holly Bradford — Customer Service Supervisor
 Kelley Casterjana — Customer Service Supervisor
 Cindy Treyes — Customer Service Supervisor
 Brian "Chance" Willams — Customer Service Supervisor

Los Angeles (LAX)
 Susie Boersma — Customer Service Supervisor
 Mike Carr — Customer Service Supervisor
 Yolanda Martin — Customer Service Supervisor
 Steve Ramirez — Customer Service Supervisor
 Gustavo Yanez — Customer Service Supervisor — AirTran Airways

Episodes

Season 1 (2004)

Season 2 (2004-2005)

Season 3 (2005)

References

External links
 

2000s American documentary television series
2004 American television series debuts
2005 American television series endings
A&E (TV network) original programming
American television series based on British television series
Documentary television series about aviation
English-language television shows
Southwest Airlines
Television series by ITV Studios
Television shows set in Houston
Aviation television series